Theodor Helfrich (13 May 1913 in Frankfurt am Main – 29 April 1978 in Ludwigshafen am Rhein) was a racing driver from Germany.  He participated in three World Championship Grands Prix, debuting on 3 August 1952, but scored no championship points. He was German Formula Two Champion in 1953, took a number of wins in the German Formula Three Championship in a Cooper-Norton, and finished in second place in the 1952 24 Hours of Le Mans race.

Complete World Championship results
(key)

References

External links 

 Theo Helfrich profile at The 500 Owners Association

German racing drivers
German Formula One drivers
Klenk Formula One drivers
1913 births
1978 deaths
24 Hours of Le Mans drivers
Sportspeople from Frankfurt
Racing drivers from Hesse